is a district in Kyoto Prefecture, Japan.

As of 2007, the district had an estimated population of 44,982 and a density of 252.27 persons per km2. The total area is 178.31 km2.

Towns and villages
Kasagi
Minamiyamashiro
Seika
Wazuka

Former towns
The following towns merged to create the new city of Kizugawa on March 12, 2007.
Kamo
Kizu
Yamashiro

Districts in Kyoto Prefecture